On May 18, 2010, a bombing took place in Kachi Paind Khan area of Dera Ismail Khan. The bomb was planted on a motorcycle and killed 13 people while injured 14 on its detonation. Deputy superintendent of Kulachi police, Muhammad Iqbal Khan was also among the deceased and was said to be the target of attack.

Background 
Dera Ismail Khan had hosted many incidents of bombing prior to this one. Policemen  and security officials are targeted by militants in Pakistan as retaliation to ongoing War in North-West Pakistan. The 2010 Dera Ismail Khan bombing was also carried out against police.

Attack 
On 18 May, when DSP of Kulachi, Iqbal Khan left his home at Kachi Paind Khan escorted by police mobile, a bomb planted in Motorcycle exploded near the police van. Security official reached the site and cordoned off the area. According to bomb disposal squad, four kilograms of material was used in the bomb. 13 people were killed while 14 got injured. The injured were brought to District Head Quarter hospital where five were said to be in critical condition. The human flesh of the victims was laid scattered on roads and bang of explosion was heard in three kilometer radius.

Victims 
According to hospital sources, besides DSP Mohammad Iqbal Khan, his gunman Irshad, driver Mohammad Mushtaq, Bashir Ahmad, Mohammad Irshad, Insaf Bibi, Irum Bibi, Mohammad Younis, Arsalan, Sabir, Abdul Sattar, Shahzeb and an unknown man were among the deceased.

The injured were identified as Bakhtullah, Mohammad Sharif, Asif Iqbal, Mulazim Hussain, Shah Jehan, Bashir Ahmad, Jamshed, Ghulam Hussain, Mohammad Ramzan, Rehmatullah, and an unidentified child while the son of Iqbal khan was also injured in the attack.

Reactions 
President of Pakistan, Asif Ali Zardari, Prime minister, Yousuf Raza Gilani, Speaker and Deputy Speaker of National Assembly, Fehmida Mirza and Faisal Karim Kundi, Chairman of Pakistan Tehreek-e-Insaf, Imran Khan, Emir Jamaat-e-Islami, Munawar Hassan and president of Pakistan Muslim League (N), Nawaz Sharif have condemned attack and offered condolence to families of victims.
Chief Minister of Khyber Pakhtunkhwa, Ameer Haider Khan Hoti condemned the attack calling it "cowardly act of terrorism" and said that this type of incidents cannot deter government commitment of war against terrorism.

References  

2010 murders in Pakistan
Terrorist incidents in Pakistan in 2010
Terrorist incidents in Dera Ismail Khan
Mass murder in Pakistan
Mass murder in 2010
2010 road incidents